Zaldy Realubit (born February 18, 1967) is a Filipino retired professional basketball player who is now the Chief Operating Officer of the Maharlika Pilipinas Basketball League. He was also the head coach of the Pilipinas Aguilas.

College and amateur career
Realubit hails from Nasipit, Agusan del Norte. He completed his high school at the Northwestern Agusan College but it was at the University of San Jose–Recoletos where he got hooked into basketball under coach Yayoy Alcoseba. Realubit went on to play for Mama's Love in the Philippine Basketball League (PABL) from 1984-1985 and RFM-Swifts in his final two years in the amateur league and has blossomed into a fine center.

Professional career

Presto
Realubit turned professional in 1989 when he was drafted by Presto Ice Cream with the 3rd pick. He played a key role in the franchise' sixth and final championship during the 1990 PBA All-Filipino Conference Finals. His impressive performance earned him a berth for the all-pro Philippine team to the 1990 Asian Games as a replacement for Jerry Codiñera.

Swift / Sunkist
After Presto's disbandment at the end of the 1992 PBA season, he moved to newcomer Sta. Lucia Realtors but was traded along with Vergel Meneses to Swift in the following conference. His stint with Swift was highly successful, culminating in Realubit winning three championships with the team, and playing there for six years.

Tanduay / FedEx
During the 2000 Governors' Cup, Realubit was traded to the Tanduay Rhum Masters in exchange for two second-round picks.

Purefoods
After leaving FedEx, he signed with the Purefoods Tender Juicy Hotdogs for the 2004–05 season. He played 14 games for the franchise, and retired thereafter.

International career
Realubit first played for the national team in 1986, when he played under coach Joe Lipa. He made it to the RP youth team in early 1987 that placed second to China in the ABC Youth championships held in Manila and sooner with the Philippine men's national team that same year. Realubit also played for the Philippines in the 1990 Asian Games, where they won the silver medal behind China.

Coaching career
Realubit first ventured into coaching after he was selected to coach the Pacquiao Powervit Pilipinas Aguilas that would compete in the 2015–16 ABL season. Unfortunately, his stint with the team did not last long, after he resigned just barely two weeks after the season started. He said internal problems, like unpaid wages and player treatment, within the team led to his resignation.

References

External links
 Player Profile at PBA-Online!

1967 births
Living people
ASEAN Basketball League coaches
Asian Games medalists in basketball
Asian Games silver medalists for the Philippines
Barako Bull Energy players
Basketball players at the 1990 Asian Games
Basketball players from Agusan del Norte
Centers (basketball)
Filipino men's basketball coaches
Great Taste Coffee Makers players
Magnolia Hotshots players
Philippine Basketball Association All-Stars
Philippines men's national basketball team players
Filipino men's basketball players
Pop Cola Panthers players
Power forwards (basketball)
Sta. Lucia Realtors players
Tanduay Rhum Masters players
USJ-R Jaguars basketball players
Medalists at the 1990 Asian Games
Great Taste Coffee Makers draft picks